Jayson King in an American college baseball coach, currently serving as head coach of the Dayton Flyers baseball program. He was previously the long-time head coach of the Franklin Pierce College Ravens. In 1998, King managed the Bourne Braves, a collegiate summer baseball team in the prestigious Cape Cod Baseball League. He has additionally coached the Lowell Spinners and the United States national baseball team. He is a native of Oakwood, Ohio. He and his wife Missy have two children.

Head coaching record

References

Living people
Baseball coaches from Massachusetts
Army Black Knights baseball coaches
Cape Cod Baseball League coaches
Dayton Flyers baseball coaches
Framingham State Rams baseball players
Franklin Pierce Ravens baseball coaches
Springfield Pride baseball coaches
UMass–Boston Beacons baseball coaches
Baseball catchers
People from Canton, Massachusetts
Year of birth missing (living people)